Studio Moderna Group is an omnichannel, multi-brand and direct-to-consumer retailer, primarily operating across Central and Eastern Europe.

In 2011, Studio Moderna launched Octaspring technology. and sold the first Dormeo mattress featuring Octaspring springs.

References

External links
 Studio Moderna

Online retailers of Slovenia
Retail companies established in 1992
Slovenian companies established in 1992